The Catholic Church in Israel is part of the worldwide Catholic Church, in full communion with the Holy See in Rome. The Catholic Church in Israel is divided into three main jurisdictions: the Latin Patriarchate of Jerusalem, the Franciscan Custody of the Holy Land, and the Salesian Mission. Each of these jurisdictions has its own responsibilities and areas of operation.

A number of institutions and organizations serve the Catholic community. The Latin Patriarchate of Jerusalem is the main Catholic institution in Israel, and it is responsible for the pastoral care of Catholics in Israel, the Palestinian territories, and Jordan. The patriarchate has a number of parishes, schools, and hospitals in the region, and it also operates the Terra Sancta Museum in Jerusalem, which showcases the history and culture of the Holy Land.

The Franciscan Custody of the Holy Land is a Catholic religious order that is responsible for the care of the holy shrines in the Holy Land, such as the Church of the Holy Sepulchre in Jerusalem and the Church of the Nativity in Bethlehem. The Salesian Mission is another Catholic religious order that operates in Israel, particularly in the area of education and youth ministry.

In addition to these institutions, there are a number of Catholic organizations and charities that operate in Israel, such as the Catholic Near East Welfare Association, which provides humanitarian assistance to Christians and other minority communities in the Middle East, and the Catholic Relief Services, which works on issues such as poverty, education and health.

Overview
There are approximately 200,000 Christians in Israel and the Palestinian territories, representing about 1.5% of the total population. The largest Catholic Churches include 64,400 Greek Melkite Catholics, 32,200 Latin Catholics, and 11,270 Maronite Catholics.

Jurisdictions of seven of the Catholic Churches overlap in Israel: the Armenian, Chaldean, Greek Melkite, Latin (Roman), Maronite, and Syriac. The Coptic Catholic patriarchate also has representation in Israel and the Palestinian territories, as does the Franciscan Custody of the Holy Land, the Territorial Prelature of the Notre Dame Center of Jerusalem, and the Personal prelature of Opus Dei, with jurisdictional presence. The Holy See is represented by the Apostolic Nuncio to Israel and the Apostolic Delegate in Jerusalem for Palestine.

About 85% of the Catholics in Israel and the Palestinian territories are Arabic-speaking. In addition to a handful of chaplaincies for expatriate clergy, pilgrims, and workers, there is also a vicariate within the Latin Patriarchate ministering to Hebrew Catholics, i.e., converts to Catholicism of Jewish descent, or Hebrew-speaking Catholics born to immigrant workers, often from the Philippines.

Local jurisdictions

Dioceses
 Latin Patriarchate of Jerusalem
 Melkite Greek Catholic Patriarchal Dependent Territory of Jerusalem
 Melkite Greek Catholic Eparchy of Akka
 Maronite Catholic Archeparchy of Haifa and the Holy Land
 Maronite Catholic Patriarchal Exarchate of Jerusalem and Palestine
 Armenian Catholic Patriarchal Exarchate of Jerusalem and Amman
 Syriac Catholic Patriarchal Exarchate of Jerusalem

See also: Chaldean Catholic Territory Dependent on the Patriarch of Jerusalem

Particular jurisdictions
 The Franciscan Custody of the Holy Land has care of most of the Christian holy sites and shrines under the jurisdiction of the Catholic Church. 
 The Territorial Prelature of the Notre Dame Center of Jerusalem is considered an Ecumenical Holy Place and pilgrim hostel, under the direct jurisdiction of the Holy See, but in the care of the Legion of Christ since November 2004. 
 The Personal prelature of Opus Dei has a small regional vicariate in Jerusalem. Its members are under the jurisdiction of the prelature, though no territory is.

Parishes and communities
There are currently 103 Catholic parishes in Israel and the Palestinian Territories:
 43 Latin
 43 Greek Melkite
 14 Maronite
 2 Syrian
 1 Armenian

There are additionally 8 language chaplaincies and 7 ethnic pastoral centers within the Latin Patriarchate:
 4 Hebrew-speaking
 2 German-speaking
 1 English-speaking
 1 French-speaking
 2 Filipino communities
 2 Russian communities
 1 African community
 1 Polish community
 1 Romanian community

Representatives of the Holy See

The Holy See is currently represented by an Apostolic Nuncio to Israel and an Apostolic Delegate in Jerusalem and Palestine. Since 1994, the same person serves in both offices, and also serves as Nuncio to Cyprus. Since 3 June 2021, Adolfo Tito Yllana has served in both offices.

In June 1762, a diplomatic relationship was established in Ottoman Syria, which also included the region of Palestine.

In March 1929, the diplomatic brief for British Palestine was attached to the Delegate to Cairo.

On 11 February 1948, with the Papal brief Supreme Pastoris, Pope Pius XII erected the Apostolic Delegation in Jerusalem and Palestine, Transjordan and Cyprus.

On 30 December 1993, the Holy See and the State of Israel signed the Fundamental Agreement Between the Holy See and the State of Israel, the first agreement between the two States, and they formally established diplomatic relations in March 1994. The Holy See established the Apostolic Nuncio to Israel.

Supra-diocesan structures

Episcopal conferences
The Assembly of the Catholic Ordinaries of the Holy Land was established in 1992 at the initiative of the Apostolic Delegate in Jerusalem to foster unity within the Catholic Churches of the Holy Land.

The regional episcopal conference for the Latin bishops is the Conference of the Latin Bishops of the Arab Regions (CELRA), established in 1967.

Ecumenical participation
The Middle East Council of Churches represents 14 million Christians in the Middle East, covering 14 countries and including representatives from 27 churches or jurisdictions (3 Oriental Orthodox, 4 Eastern Orthodox, 7 Catholic, and 13 Protestant/Evangelical).

The Heads of Churches in Jerusalem is a gathering of the patriarchs and other ordinaries of 13 of the local Christian churches in Jerusalem, including Eastern Orthodox, Oriental Orthodox, Eastern Catholic, Latin Catholic, Anglican, and Lutheran churches.

Religious institutes

There are 1,764 members of religious orders and institutes of consecrated life in Israel and the Palestinian territories.

The oldest of these is the Franciscan Custody of the Holy Land, established as a province in 1217.

They are represented by the Committee of the Religious Men of the Holy Land and the Union of Religious Superiors of Women in the Holy Land.

Male religious
There are 540 male religious, representing the following congregations:
 Assumptionists
 Basilians
 Benedictines Dormition Abbey
 Benedictines Olivetan
 Clerical Society of the Most Holy Trinity at Mirinae
 De La Salle Brothers
 Discalced Carmelites
 Families of the Visitation
 Hospitaller Order of St. John of God
 Institute of the Incarnate Word
 Jesuits
 Lazarists
 Legionaries of Christ
 Little Brothers of Jesus
 Little Brothers of Jesus Caritas
 Little Family of the Annunciation
 Missionaries of Charity Contemplative
 Monks of Bethlehem
 Order of Friars Minor Capuchin
 Order of Preachers
 Order of the Servants of Mary
 Passionists
 Religious of Our Lady of Sion
 Sacred Heart Fathers of Betharram
 Salesians of Don Bosco
 Servants of Charity
 Sons of Divine Providence
 Trappists
 White Fathers

Female religious
There are 1,079 female religious, from the following congregations:

Other Institutes of Consecrated Life

There are 145 members of other institutes of consecrated life:
 Association Fraternelle Internationale
 Bose Monastic Community
 Chemin Neuf Community
 Comunione e Liberazione
 Community Cancao Nova
 Community Obra de Maria
 Community of Sant'Egidio
 Community of the Beatitudes
 Emmanuel Community
 Focolare
 Koinonia John the Baptist Community
 Neocatechumenal Way
 Regnum Christi
 Sermig Brotherhood of Hope
 Shalom Catholic Community

Lay organizations and institutes

Catholic scouting and youth ministry

 2,500 members in 16 troops of the Catholic Scout Association in Israel
 2,500 members in 12 troops of the Palestinian Catholic Scouts of Saint John the Baptist
 Young Catholic Students (Jeunesse Étudiante Catholique)

Lay ecclesial movements

 135 members of the Neocatechumenal Way
 16 members of Comunione e Liberazione
  members of the personal prelature of Opus Dei

Medical and social services
There are:
 9 charitable and humanitarian organizations
 7 hospitals
 7 centers for the disabled
 6 orphanages
 5 homes for the elderly

Military and hospitaller orders
 Equestrian Order of the Holy Sepulchre of Jerusalem
 Sovereign Military Order of Malta

Universities and educational institutes
 Studium Theologicum Jerosolymitanum, Franciscan Custody of the Holy Land, founded 1866.
 École Biblique, Dominicans, founded 1920. 
 Studium Biblicum Franciscanum, Pontifical University Antonianum, Franciscans, founded 1924.
 College of Ancient Near East Studies of the Pontifical Biblical Institute, Jesuits, founded 1927.
 Latin Patriarchal Seminary of Jerusalem, Latin Patriarchate of Jerusalem, founded 1936.
 Casa de Santiago - Instituto Español Bíblico y Arqueológico, Spanish Bishops' Conference and Pontifical University of Salamanca, founded 1955.
 Tantur Ecumenical Institute, University of Notre Dame, founded 1972.
 Bethlehem University, De La Salle Brothers, founded 1973.
 German Institute of Biblical and Theological Studies, Dormition Abbey, Benedictines, founded 1973.
 Bat Kol Institute, Sisters of Sion, founded 1983
 Center for Biblical Formation, Ecce Homo, Sisters of Sion, founded 1984
 Institut Albert Decourtray for Studies in Judaism and Hebrew Literature, École cathédrale de Paris, founded 1991
 Studium Theologicum Galilaeae "Redemptoris Mater", Neocatechumenal Way, founded 2009.
 Polis Institute of Languages and Humanities, Pontifical University of the Holy Cross, Opus Dei, founded 2011.
 Studium Theologicum Salesianum, Salesian Pontifical University, Salesians of Don Bosco, founded 2011.

There are, additionally, 71 primary and secondary schools

Pilgrimage

Pilgrimage services
 Christian Information Centre, founded 1973.
 Episcopal Commission for Christian Pilgrimages
 Franciscan Pilgrim's Office, founded 2009.
 Latin Patriarchate Pilgrimages

Shrines and holy sites
 Church of the Resurrection, Jerusalem - Franciscans share custody of Christianity's holiest site along with the Greek Orthodox, Armenian Apostolic, Coptic Orthodox, Ethiopian Orthodox, and Syriac Orthodox Churches.
 Bethphage, Jerusalem, Franciscans
 Cenacle, Jerusalem, Franciscans
 Dominus Flevit, Jerusalem, Franciscans
 Dormition Abbey, Jerusalem, Benedictines
 Flagellation Church, Jerusalem, Franciscans
 Garden of Gethsemane, Jerusalem, Franciscans
 Pater Noster Church, Jerusalem, Carmelite Nuns
 St. Anne Church, Jerusalem, Missionaries of Africa
 St. Peter in Gallicantu, Jerusalem, Assumptionists
 St. Stephen Church, Jerusalem, Dominicans
 Via Dolorosa 3rd Station, Jerusalem, Armenian Catholics
 Via Dolorosa 4th Station, Jerusalem, Armenian Catholics
 Via Dolorosa 5th Station, Jerusalem, Franciscans
 Via Dolorosa 6th Station, Jerusalem, Little Sisters of Jesus
 Via Dolorosa 7th Station, Jerusalem, Franciscans
 Emmaus of the Crusaders, Abu Gosh, Benedictines
 Shepherd's Field, Beit Sahour, Franciscans
 St. Lazarus, Bethany, Franciscans
 Church of the Nativity, Bethlehem, Franciscans
 Milk Grotto, Bethlehem, Franciscans
 First Miracle Church, Cana, Franciscans
 House of Peter, Capernaum, Franciscans
 Church of the Visitation, Ein Karem, Franciscans
 St. John in the Desert, Ein Karem, Franciscans
 Stella Maris, Haifa, Carmelites
 Baptism of Our Lord, Jordan River, Franciscans
 Emmaus Nicoplis, Latrun, Betharram/Beatitudes
 Duc in Altum, Migdal, Legion of Christ
 Sermon on the Mount, Mount of Beatitudes, Franciscan Sisters of IHM
 Sacrifice of Elijah, Muhraqa, Carmelites
 Church of the Annunciation, Nazareth, Franciscans
 Church of St. Joseph, Nazareth, Franciscans
 Synagogue Church, Nazareth, Greek Melkite Catholics
 Emmaus Qubeibeh, Qubeibeh, Franciscans
 Church of Nicodemus, Ramleh, Franciscans
 Multiplication of the Loaves, Tabgha, Benedictines
 Primacy of Peter, Tabgha, Franciscans
 Transfiguration, Mount Tabor, Franciscans
 House of Parables, Taybeh, 
 Church of St. Peter, Tiberias, Koinonia Giovanni Battista

Pilgrimage centers in Jerusalem

 Armenian Guest House
 Austrian Hospice of the Holy Family
 Dom Polski (Musrara)
 Dom Polski (Old City)
 Ecce Homo, Sisters of Sion
 Franciscan Missionaries of Mary
 Knight's Palace
 Maison d'Abraham
 Notre Dame of Jerusalem Center
 Paulus-Haus
 Rosary Sisters (Mamila)
 Rosary Sisters (Old City)
 Saint Charles German Hospice
 Saint Maroun Guesthouse
 Saint Thomas Center
 Tantur Ecumenical Institute

Pilgrim's decorations
 Pilgrim's Shell, Equestrian Order of the Holy Sepulchre
 Jerusalem Pilgrim's Cross, Franciscan Custody of the Holy Land

Popes, saints, martyrs

Saints and Martyrs
 Mary of Nazareth, Theotokos
 Mary Magdalene, Apostle to the Apostles 
 Andrew, Apostle
 Bartholomew, Apostle
 Matthew, Apostle
 Jude/Thaddeus, Apostle
 Simon the Canaanite, Apostle
 James the Greater, Apostle, c.44
 James the Less, Apostle, c.62
 Thomas, Apostle, c.72
 Philip, Apostle, c.80
 John, Apostle, c.100
 James the Just, first Bishop of Jerusalem, c.69
 Simeon of Jerusalem, bishop, c.107
 Matthias of Jerusalem, bishop, c.120
 Narcissus of Jerusalem, bishop, c.216
 Alexander of Jerusalem. bishop, c.251
 Zamudas of Jerusalem, bishop, c.301
 Macarius of Jerusalem, bishop, c.333
 Maximus of Jerusalem, bishop, c.350
 Cyril of Jerusalem, bishop, c.383
 Elias of Jerusalem, patriarch, c.518
 Zosimas of Palestine, monk, c.560 (Feast: 4 April)
 Sophronius of Jerusalem, patriarch, d.638

Unnamed martyrs
 33 Martyrs, c.70 (Feast: 16 August)
 Monks slain by Arab invaders, c.410 (Feast: 28 May)
 Hermits slain by Saracen invaders, c.509 (Feast: 19 February)
 1500 Martyrs of Samaria, c.614 (Feast: 22 June)
 44 hermits of St. Sabbas Monastery, c.614 (Feast: 16 May)

Popes
The Popes who were born in, or first ministered in, the Holy Land:

 Saint Peter the Apostle, c.64
 Pope Evaristus, c.99-107
 Pope Theodore I, 642-649
 Pope Urban IV, 1261-1264

See also
 Catholic Church in Palestine
 Catholic Church in the Middle East
 Latin Patriarchate of Jerusalem
 List of parishes of the Latin Patriarchate of Jerusalem
 Our Lady of Palestine
 Custody of the Holy Land
 Latin Church in the Middle East
 Redemptoris nostri cruciatus

References

External links
 The Holy See
  Catholic Church in the Holy Land
  Catholic Church in the Holy Land, Statistics
  Armenian Catholic Church
  Chaldean Catholic Church
  Coptic Catholic Church
  Greek Melkite Catholic Church
 Latin Patriarchate of Jerusalem
  Maronite Catholic Church 
  Syriac Catholic Church
  Saint James Vicariate for Hebrew-speaking Catholics in Israel
  Catholic Near East Welfare Association
  Equestrian Order of the Holy Sepulchre of Jerusalem
  Tantur Ecumenical Institute
  Raymond Cohen, Israel and the Holy See Negotiate: A Case Study in Diplomacy across Religions
  Jewish Virtual Library, Minority Communities in Israel: Christians
  Ron Roberson, CSP, The Eastern Christian Churches: A Brief Survey, 7th Edition

 
Israel